A cast saw is an oscillating power tool used to remove orthopedic casts. Unlike a circular saw with a rotating blade, a cast saw uses a sharp, small-toothed blade rapidly oscillating or vibrating back and forth over a very small angle to cut material. This device is often used with a cast spreader.

The patient's skin frequently comes into contact with the cast saw blade without cutting although it can cause lacerations when used over bony prominences. The design enables the saw to cut rigid materials such as plaster or fiberglass while soft tissues such as skin move back and forth with the blade, dissipating the shear forces, preventing injury. A general technique in the use of cast saw often involves a demonstration before actually cutting the cast.

Modern cast saws date back to the plaster cast cutting saw which was submitted for patent on April 2, 1945 by Homer H. Stryker, an orthopaedic surgeon from Kalamazoo, Michigan.

Cast removal procedures result in complications in less than 1% of patients. These complications can include skin abrasions or thermal injuries from friction between the saw and cast. Temperatures exceeding  have been recorded during removal of fiberglass casts. Proper use of the saw is to perforate (instead of cutting) the cast, which can then be separated using a cast spreader.

Alternatives include cast cutting shears which were patented in 1950 by Neil McKay.

See also
Multi-tool (power tool)

References

External links
Demonstration of a cast saw on:
bare skin 
plaster material 

Power tools
Orthopedic treatment